Santhebennur is a panchayat town in the Davanagere district of the state of Karnataka, India.  It is about 40 kilometers from Davangere and about 60 kilometers from Shimoga. Channagiri, taluk headquarters town, is 22 kilometers away.

Pushkarani
Santhebennur is famous for a historic pond called "Santhebennur Pushkarini," locally called "Honda." Apart from the structure in the center, four more can be seen on the surrounding steps, and there are two more - one each on the left & right. The Pushkarani itself is in front of a gallery kind of structure, open towards the Pushkarani, and without any rooms. These structures are built with a mix of stone, bricks & mortar.

Other information

Santebennur has an education institute run by Vijaya Yuvaka Sangha. This organization was founded by Sathyanarayan Nadig. Now Sri Sumateendra Nadig is care taker for Vijaya Yuvaka Sangha.

In Santhebennur there is one marriage hall and degree college is also there. Mr.H.M.Omkaraiah presently serving as Assistant Commissioner of Police in Bangalore is the first individual to be awarded President of India's and Chief Minister's gold medal for meritorious service.

Also in Santhebennur, Sri Rama Temple is another good place to visit. It was inaugurated by  Mysore Raj Arasa Odeyar many years ago. Every year on the occasion of Rama Navami "Sri Ramothsava" is celebrated with Rathotsava

External links
Pushkarani

Cities and towns in Davanagere district